
Year 463 BC was a year of the pre-Julian Roman calendar. At the time, it was known as the Year of the Consulship of Priscus and Helva (or, less frequently, year 291 Ab urbe condita). The denomination 463 BC for this year has been used since the early medieval period, when the Anno Domini calendar era became the prevalent method in Europe for naming years.

Events 
 By place 
 Rome 
 The Senate and People of Rome appoint Gaius Aemilius Mamercus interrex.
 Greece 
 In Athens, the democratic statesman Ephialtes and the young Pericles attempt to get the oligarchic Kimon ostracized for allegedly receiving bribes. Kimon is charged by Pericles and other democratic politicians with having been bribed not to attack the King of Macedonia (who may have been suspected of covertly helping the Thasian rebels). Though Kimon is acquitted, his influence on the Athenian people is waning.
 Themistocles, who is in exile, approaches the Persian King Artaxerxes I seeking Persian help in regaining power in Athens. Artaxerxes is unwilling to help him, but instead gives him the satrapy of Magnesia.
 After a two year siege, Thasos falls to the Athenians under Kimon who compels the Thasians to destroy their walls, surrender their ships, pay an indemnity and an annual contribution to Athens.

Births

Deaths

References